Wila Umani (Aymara wila red, uma water, -ni a suffix to indicate ownership, "the one with red water", also spelled Vila Umani) is a  mountain in the Andes of Bolivia. It is located in the La Paz Department, Larecaja Province, Guanay Municipality. Wila Umani lies in the eastern extensions of the Cordillera Real.

References 

Mountains of La Paz Department (Bolivia)